Poul Holm is a former Danish badminton player. He won five All England titles and four Danish singles titles.

Medal Record at the All England Badminton Championships

References

Danish male badminton players